Decimius Magnus Ausonius (– c. 395) was a Roman poet and teacher of  rhetoric from Burdigala in Aquitaine, modern Bordeaux, France. For a time he was tutor to the future emperor Gratian, who afterwards bestowed the consulship on him. His best-known poems are Mosella, a description of the river Moselle, and Ephemeris, an account of a typical day in his life. His many other verses show his concern for his family, friends, teachers, and circle of well-to-do acquaintances and his delight in the technical handling of meter.

Biography
Decimius Magnus Ausonius was born  in Burdigala (modern Bordeaux), the son of Julius Ausonius (c. AD 290–378), a physician of Greek ancestry, and Aemilia Aeonia, daughter of Caecilius Argicius Arborius, descended on both sides from established, land-owning Gallo-Roman families of southwestern Gaul. Ausonius was given a strict upbringing by his aunt and grandmother, both named Aemilia. He received an excellent education at Bordeaux and at Toulouse, where his maternal uncle, Aemilius Magnus Arborius, was a professor. Ausonius did well in grammar and rhetoric, but professed that his progress in Greek was unsatisfactory. In 328 Arborius was summoned to Constantinople to become tutor to Constans, the youngest son of Constantine the Great, whereupon Ausonius returned to Bordeaux to complete his education under the rhetorician Minervius Alcimus.

Having completed his studies, he trained for some time as an advocate, but he preferred teaching. In 334 he became a grammaticus (instructor) at a school of rhetoric in Bordeaux, and afterwards a rhetor or professor. His teaching attracted many pupils, some of whom became eminent in public life. His most famous pupil was the poet Paulinus, who later became a Christian and Bishop of Nola.

After thirty years of this work Ausonius was summoned by emperor Valentinian I to teach his son, Gratian, the heir-apparent. When Valentinian took Gratian on the German campaigns of 368–9, Ausonius accompanied them. Ausonius was able to turn literary skill into political capital. In recognition of his services emperor Valentinian bestowed on Ausonius the rank of quaestor. His presence at court gave Ausonius the opportunity to connect with a number of influential people. In 369 he met Quintus Aurelius Symmachus; their friendship proved mutually beneficial.

Gratian liked and respected his tutor, and when he himself became emperor in 375 he began bestowing on Ausonius and his family the highest civil honors. That year Ausonius was made Praetorian Prefect of Gaul, campaigned against the Alemanni and received as part of his booty a slave-girl, Bissula (to whom he addressed a poem), while his father, though nearly ninety years old, was given the rank of Prefect of Illyricum.

In 376 Ausonius's son, Hesperius, was made proconsul of Africa. In 379 Ausonius was awarded the consulate, the highest Roman honor.

In 383 the army of Britain, led by Magnus Maximus, revolted against Gratian and assassinated him at Lyons; and when emperor Valentinian II was driven out of Italy, Ausonius retired to his estates near Burdigala (now Bordeaux) in Gaul. When Magnus Maximus was overthrown by emperor Theodosius I in 388, Ausonius did not leave his country estates. They were, he says, his nidus senectutis, the "nest of his old age", and there he spent the rest of his days, composing poetry and writing to many eminent contemporaries, several of whom had been his pupils. His estates supposedly included the land now owned by Château Ausone, which takes its name from him.

Ausonius appears to have been a late and perhaps not very enthusiastic convert to Christianity. He died about 395.

His grandson, Paulinus of Pella, was also a poet; his works attest to the devastation which Ausonius's Gaul would face soon after his death.

List of his works

 Epigrammata Ausonii de diversis rebus. About 120 epigrams on various topics.
 Ephemeris. A description of the occupations of the day from morning till evening, in various meters, composed before 367. Only the beginning and end are preserved.
 Parentalia. 30 poems of various lengths, mostly in elegiac meter, on deceased relations, composed after his consulate, when he had already been a widower for 36 years.
 Commemoratio professorum Burdigalensium or Professores. A continuation of the Parentalia, dealing with the famous teachers of his native Bordeaux whom he had known.
 Epitaphia. 26 epitaphs of heroes from the Trojan war, translated from Greek
 Caesares. On the 12 emperors described by Suetonius.
 Ordo urbium nobilium. 14 pieces, dealing with 17 towns (Rome to Bordeaux), in hexameters, and composed after the downfall of Maximus in 388.
 Ludus VII Sapientium. A kind of puppet play in which the seven wise men appear successively and have their say.
 The so-called Idyllia. 20 pieces are grouped under this arbitrary title, the most famous of which is the Mosella. It also includes:
 Griphus ternarii numeri
 De aetatibus Hesiodon
 Monosticha de aerumnis Herculis
 De ambiguitate eligendae vitae
 De viro bono
 EST et NON
 De rosis nascentibus (dubious)
 Versus paschales
 Epicedion in patrem
 Technopaegnion
 Cento nuptialis, composed of lines and half-lines of Vergil.
 Bissula Protrepticus Genethliacon Eglogarum liber. A collection of all kinds of astronomical and astrological versifications in epic and elegiac meter.
 Epistolarum liber. 25 verse letters in various meters.
 Ad Gratianum gratiarum actio pro consulatu. Prose speech of thanks to the emperor Gratian on the occasion of attaining the consulship, delivered at Treves in 379.
 Periochae Homeri Iliadis et Odyssiae. A prose summary of Homer's Iliad and Odyssey, attributed to but probably not written by Ausonius.
 Praefatiunculae. Prefaces by the poet to various collections of his poems, including a response to the emperor Theodosius I's request for his poems.

Some characteristics of his works

Although admired by his contemporaries, the writings of Ausonius have not since been ranked among Latin literature's finest. His style is easy and fluent, and his Mosella is appreciated for its evocation of the life and country along the river Moselle; but he is considered derivative and unoriginal.  Edward Gibbon pronounced in his Decline and Fall of the Roman Empire that "the poetical fame of Ausonius condemns the taste of his age." However, his works have several points of interest; for example:

1. his references to winemaking, frequently cited by historians as early evidence of large-scale viticulture in the now-famous wine country around his native Bordeaux.

2. his contribution to the carpe diem topic (if the following poem is indeed his):

3. his somewhat unique Cento Nuptialis, in which he fulfils an imperial commission to compose an epithalamium using the "love is war" trope by writing it in the form of a cento (in other words, a mashup) lifting lines from Vergil:

Saw mill

His writings are also remarkable for mentioning, in passing, the working of a water mill sawing marble on a tributary of the Moselle:
 

The excerpt sheds new light on the development of Roman technology in using water power for different applications. It is one of the rare references in Roman literature to water mills used to cut stone, but is a logical consequence of the application of water power to mechanical sawing of stone (and presumably wood also). Earlier references to the widespread use of mills occur in Vitruvius in his De Architectura of circa 25 BC, and the Naturalis Historia of Pliny the Elder published in 77 AD. Such applications of mills were to multiply again after the fall of the Empire through the Middle Ages into the modern era. The mills at Barbegal in southern France are famous for their application of water power to grinding grain to make flour and were built in the 1st century AD. They consisted of 16 mills in a parallel sequence on a hill near Arles.

The construction of a saw mill is even simpler than a flour or grinding mill, since no gearing is needed, and the rotary saw blade can be driven direct from the water wheel axle, as the example of Sutter's Mill in California shows. However, a different mechanism is shown by the sawmill at Hieropolis involving a frame saw operated through a crank and connecting rod.

See also

 Notes 

References

Further reading
 Booth, Alan D. 1982. "The Academic Career of Ausonius." Phoenix 36: 329–343.
Brown, Peter. 2014.  In Through the Eye of a Needle: Wealth, the Fall of Rome, and the Making of Christianity in the West, 350-550 AD Princeton: Princeton University Press, 185–207.
 Della Corte, Francesco. 1977. “Bissula.” Romanobarbarica 2:17–25.
Dill, Samuel. 1898. "The Society Of Aquitaine In The Time Of Ausonius." In  Roman Society In The Last Century Of The Western Empire. London: Macmillan, 167–186.
 Green, R. P. H. 1999. "Ausonius’ Fasti and Caesares Revisited." Classical Quarterly 49:573–578.
 Kay, N. M. 2001. Ausonius: Epigrams. London: Duckworth.
 Knight, Gillian R. 2005. "Friendship and Erotics in the Late Antique Verse-Epistle: Ausonius to Paulinus Revisited." Rheinisches Museum 148:361–403.
 Shanzer, Danuta. 1998. "The Date and Literary Context of Ausonius's Mosella: Valentinian I's Alemannic Campaigns and an unnamed office-holder." Historia 47.2: 204–233.
 Sivan, Hagith. 1993. Ausonius of Bordeaux: Genesis of a Gallic Aristocracy. London and New York: Routledge.
 Sivan, Hagith. 1992. "The Dedicatory Presentation in Late Antiquity: The Example of Ausonius." Illinois Classical Studies 17.1: 83–101.
 Sowers, Brian P. 2016. "Amicitia and Late Antique Nugae: Reading Ausonius' Reading Community." American Journal of Philology. 137.3: 511–540.
 Taylor, Rabun. 2009. "Death, the Maiden, and the Mirror: Ausonius's Water World." Arethusa 42.2: 181-205
 Yaceczko, Lionel. 2021. Ausonius Grammaticus: the Christening of Philology in the Late Roman West.'' Gorgias Press.

External links

Works by Ausonius at Perseus Digital Library
 Works by Ausonius at the Internet Archive
 Latin text of Mosella
 Ausonius' Opera Omnia: IntraText Digital Library
 Opera Omnia by Migne Patrologia Latina
 wiki text and translation of Moselle
 Wikipedia France: Ausone, vie et travaux
 Ausonius at Somni

4th-century births
4th-century deaths
4th-century Christians
4th-century Gallo-Roman people
4th-century Latin writers
4th-century Roman poets
4th-century Roman consuls
Ancient Roman rhetoricians
Imperial Roman consuls
Writers from Bordeaux
Praetorian prefects of Gaul
Roman-era Greeks
Ancient Roman poets